The 2001–02 Southern Hemisphere tropical cyclone season comprises three different basins. Their respective seasons are:

2001-02 South-West Indian Ocean cyclone season west of 90°E,
2001-02 Australian region cyclone season between 90°E and 160°E, and
2001-02 South Pacific cyclone season east of 160°E.

 
Southern Hemisphere tropical cyclone seasons